The 2018 ICC Under-19 Cricket World Cup was an international limited-overs cricket tournament that was held in New Zealand from 13 January to 3 February 2018. It was the twelfth edition of the Under-19 Cricket World Cup, and the third to be held in New Zealand (after the 2002 and 2010 events). New Zealand was the first country to host the event three times. The opening ceremony took place on 7 January 2018. The West Indies were the defending champions. However, they failed to defend their title, after losing their first two group fixtures.

Following the group stage fixtures, Afghanistan, Australia, Bangladesh, England, India, New Zealand, Pakistan and South Africa had all qualified for the Super League quarter-final stage of the tournament. The other eight teams moved to the Plate League to determine their final placements in the competition. Sri Lanka went on to win the Plate League, giving them a final position of ninth overall in the tournament.

In the first Super League semi-final, Australia beat Afghanistan by 6 wickets to progress to the final. In the second semi-final, India beat Pakistan by 203 runs to advance into the final. In the third-place playoff, no play was possible due to rain and a wet outfield. Pakistan therefore finished in third place, as they finished their group ahead of Afghanistan on net run rate. In the final, India beat Australia by 8 wickets to win their fourth Under-19 World Cup, the most by any side.

Qualification

The ten full members of the International Cricket Council (ICC), as of 2016, qualified automatically for the tournament. Namibia, which placed seventh at the 2016 World Cup, also qualified automatically as the highest ranked associate member. The other five places in the tournament were awarded to the winners of the five regional under-19 tournaments.

Venues

Umpires
On 3 January 2018, the ICC appointed the officials for the tournament. Along with the seventeen umpires, Jeff Crowe, Dev Govindjee, David Jukes and Graeme Labrooy were also named as the match referees.

 Rob Bailey
 Sourav Ramos Chouhan
 Anil Chaudhary
 Nigel Duguid
 Shaun George
 Shaun Haig

 Mark Hawthorne
 Ranmore Martinesz
 C. K. Nandan
 David Odhiambo
 Buddhi Pradhan
 Ian Ramage

 Ahsan Raza
 Shozab Raza
 Tim Robinson
 Langton Rusere
 Paul Wilson

Squads

Each team selected a 15-man squad for the tournament. Any players born on or after 1 September 1998 were eligible to be selected for the competition.

Group stage
The fixtures for the tournament were confirmed by the ICC on 17 August 2017.

Group A

Group B

Group C

Group D

Plate League

Plate quarter-finals

Plate playoff semi-finals

Plate semi-finals

Super League

Super League quarter-finals

Super League playoff semi-finals

Super League semi-finals

Placement matches

15th-place playoff

13th-place playoff

11th-place playoff

9th-place playoff (Plate Final)

7th-place playoff

5th-place playoff

3rd-place playoff

Final

Final standings

References

External links
 ICC U19 Cricket World Cup 2018 at ICC
 ICC U19 Cricket World Cup 2018 at New Zealand Cricket
 Series home at ESPN Cricinfo

ICC Under-19 Cricket World Cup
2018 in cricket
International cricket competitions in New Zealand
International cricket competitions in 2017–18
 
Under-19
Under-19 Cricket World Cup